The Lands End Nunataks are two rock nunataks  north-northwest of Airdrop Peak at the north end of Ebony Ridge, Antarctica. The nunataks lie at the east side of the terminus of Beardmore Glacier and mark the northern termination of the Commonwealth Range at Ross Ice Shelf. The descriptive name was recommended to the Advisory Committee on Antarctic Names by John Gunner of the Ohio State University Institute of Polar Studies, who, with Henry H. Brecher, measured a geological section here on January 16, 1970.

References

Nunataks of Antarctica
Dufek Coast